Binoy Bashi Joldas ( – 6 April 2002) was a Bangladeshi dhol player. He was awarded Ekushey Padak in 2001 by the Government of Bangladesh for his contribution to the instrumental music.

Background
Joldas was born to Upendralal Joldas and Sarbala Joldas in 1911 in Chittagong District.

Joldas played dhol with Ramesh Shil, a Bengali bard, for 35 years.

Personal life
Joldas was married to Asitipor Surbala Joldas. Together they had two sons, Shukhlal Das and  Babul Das.

References

1910s births
2002 deaths
People from Chittagong
Bangladeshi drummers
Recipients of the Ekushey Padak